Events from the year 1801 in Canada.

Incumbents
Monarch: George III

Federal government
Parliament of Lower Canada: 3rd (starting January 8)
Parliament of Upper Canada: 3rd (starting May 28)

Governors
Governor of the Canadas: Robert Milnes
Governor of New Brunswick: Thomas Carleton
Governor of Nova Scotia: John Wentworth
Commodore-Governor of Newfoundland: James Gambier
Governor of St. John's Island: Edmund Fanning

Events
David Thompson fails to cross Rocky Mountains. 
Alexander Mackenzie's Voyages to the Frozen and Pacific Oceans published in London.
Mackenzie knighted in honor of his explorations.
Shipbuilding has become an important industry in Canada.
Two ships, the Sarah and the Dove, arrive at Upper Canada carrying 700 passengers from Lochaber, Scotland from the Cameron and Fraser clans.
Cassidy's Ltd. is established, third oldest company closed its doors in 2000

Births
January 18 – James Evans, missionary and linguist (d.1846)
March 11 – William Henry Draper, politician, lawyer, and judge (d. 1877)
May 31 – Robert Rankin, timber merchant and shipowner (d. 1870)

Full date unknown
Edward Feild, Church of England clergyman, inspector of schools, bishop of Newfoundland (d.1876) 
Wilson Ruffin Abbott, businessman and landowner (d.1876)
Shanawdithit, the last known survivor of the Beothuks (d.1829)

Deaths
December 28 – Samuel Holland, army officer, military engineer, surveyor, office holder, politician, and landowner (b.1728)

References 

 
Years of the 19th century in Canada
1801 in North America